The Gharmi, or Garmi people, are one of the original groups of Tajiks, originate from the Rasht Valley in central Tajikistan. From the 1920s to 1955 there was a Gharm oblast in Tajikistan, and henceforth people from central Tajikistan were known as Gharmis. During the 1950s many Gharmis were forced to migrate from central Tajikistan to the Vakhsh River Valley in western Tajikistan. Gharmis were largely excluded from government positions, which were dominated by individuals from Khujand and Kulob. Gharmis who settled in Qurghonteppa Oblast are frequently described as a clan group that found social niches in education and the marketplace.

After Tajikistan became independent in 1991, many Gharmis participated in protests against the government. When the Civil War of Tajikistan broke out in 1992 a large number of Gharmis joined the DPT-IRP opposition. The organization Human Rights Watch among others, reported that Gharmis were targeted for execution, disappearances, mass killings, and Gharmi villages were burnt. During the fall and winter of 1992 as many as 90,000 Gharmis and Pamiris were expelled from their homes and found refuge in Afghanistan in a campaign described by the United States Department of State as a pogrom. This was followed by heavy fighting in the Rasht Valley between government and opposition forces that led to the destruction of villages. There is evidence that rape was used by both sides during this campaign.

References

Ethnic groups in Tajikistan